Shangcheng District is the capital and one of ten urban districts of Hangzhou, the capital of Zhejiang Province, People's Republic of China, it is located in the core urban area of Hangzhou.

History
The district lies beside Hangzhou's famous West Lake and includes the territory of the former imperial Chinese cities of Qiantang and Lin'an, the imperial capital of the Song dynasty from 1138 to 1276. Hangzhou's four imperial academies were located here. They were the Wansong Academy  now a park), the Ziyang Academy  now Ziyang Primary School), the Qiushi Academy  now Zhejiang University), and the Zongwen Academy  now Zhangzhou High School #10).

Present
The district government is located on 3 Huimin Rd. The district hosts the headquarters of military region in the province and is also known for its prison where political prisoners such as Zhu Yufu are incarcerated. Some prominent schools are located nearby, including China National Academy of Fine Arts, Hangzhou Second High School, and Hangzhou Fourth High School.

Administrative divisions
Subdistricts:
Qingpo Subdistrict (清波街道), Hubin Subdistrict (湖滨街道), Xiaoying Subdistrict (小营街道), Nanxing Subdistrict (南星街道), Ziyang Subdistrict (紫阳街道), Wangjiang Subdistrict (望江街道)

Honors

Religion
The local people believe in Buddhism, Taoism, Catholicism and Protestantism. Haichao Temple is one of the most famous Buddhist temples in the area.

References

External links
Official website of Shangcheng District Government

Geography of Hangzhou
Districts of Zhejiang